Maphutha Stephen Dolo (born  in Pietersburg, South Africa) is a South African rugby union player who last played for the  in the Currie Cup. His regular position is winger.

Career

Youth

In 2008, he was selected in the Limpopo Blue Bulls' Under-16 squad that participated at the Grant Khomo Week competition; this also led to his inclusion in the South African Under-16 Elite Squad. He also played Under-18 Craven Week rugby for the Limpopo Blue Bulls in both 2009 and 2010.

He moved to Bloemfontein in 2011 and joined the ' academy, where he played for the  side in the 2011 Under-19 Provincial Championship and for the  side in the Under-21 Provincial Championships in 2012 and 2013.

Varsity Cup

He was named in a Varsity Cup Dream Team at the conclusion of the 2015 Varsity Cup tournament which played one match against the South Africa Under-20s in Stellenbosch.

Free State Cheetahs

He made an additional four appearances in the competition as they failed to qualify for the Quarter Final stages of the competition.

References

South African rugby union players
Living people
1992 births
People from Polokwane
Rugby union wings
Free State Cheetahs players
Rugby union players from Limpopo